Voice of Teen is a singing reality show based in Nepal organized by Super A-One Media Pvt. Ltd. It is a talent hunt between the ages 13 to 19.

Airing 
Voice of Teen airs every Friday 9:30 PM (Nepal Time) on Nepal Television.

Sponsors 
Season 1 is title sponsored by Hero Honda. Its other supporting partners are
 Triton International College
 Meronepalma.com

Seasons 
Voice of Teen started in 2009. Rubina Uprety and Bezay Khadka hosted the show.

External links
 Voice of Teen - Official Website

Nepal
Nepalese television series
2010s Nepalese television series
2010 Nepalese television series debuts
Nepalese reality television series
Television series about teenagers